Babino  is a village in the administrative district of Gmina Choroszcz, within Białystok County, Podlaskie Voivodeship, in north-eastern Poland.

On March 22, 1952, in the town, near the Warsaw-Białystok road, the National Military Union (NZW) patrol commanded by Stanisław Franciszek Grabowski ("Wiarus") were ambushed and killed. Stanisław Grabowski was one of the longest fighting soldiers of the anti-communist underground in post-war Poland. During the tearing up of the raid, Grabowski and two other partisans (Edward Wądołowski, pseudonym "Humorek" and Lucjan Zalewski, pseudonym "Żbik") died with weapons in hand.

Transport 
Roads in Babino:
  Helsinki – Kaunas – Warszawa – Praga,
  Kudowa-Zdrój - Wrocław - Warszawa - Białystok - Suwałki - Budzisko,

In Babino on  National Road  Building express way  on section Białystok - Stare Jeżewo long 24,5km 15,2mile.

References

Babino